The 1824–1825 United States Senate election in Pennsylvania was held between December 1824 and February 1825. William Marks was elected by the Pennsylvania General Assembly to the United States Senate.

Results
Incumbent Democratic-Republican Walter Lowrie, who was elected in 1818, was not a candidate for re-election to another term. The Pennsylvania General Assembly, consisting of the House of Representatives and the Senate, convened on December 14, 1824, to elect a new Senator to fill the term beginning on March 4, 1825. Thirty-two ballots were recorded between that date and February 14, 1825. The results of the thirty-second and final ballot of both houses combined are as follows:

|-
|-bgcolor="#EEEEEE"
| colspan="3" align="right" | Totals
| align="right" | 133
| align="right" | 100.00%
|}

References

External links
Pennsylvania Election Statistics: 1682-2006 from the Wilkes University Election Statistics Project

1824-25
Pennsylvania
1824 Pennsylvania elections
Pennsylvania
1825 Pennsylvania elections